Pingla is a community development block that forms an administrative division in the Kharagpur subdivision of Paschim Medinipur district in the Indian state of West Bengal.

Geography

Pingla CD block is a flood prone area affected by water-logging leading to loss of crops. In this block 100% of the cultivated area has highly productive alluvial soil.

Pingla CD block is bounded by Debra CD block in the north, Panskura  and Moyna CD blocks, in Purba Medinipur district, in the east, Sabang CD block in the south and Kharagpur II CD block in the west.

It is located 36 km from Midnapore, the district headquarters.

Pingla CD block has an area of 224.48 km2. It has 1 panchayat samity, 10 gram panchayats, 142 gram sansads (village councils), 182 mouzas and 175 inhabited villages. Pingla police station serves this block. Headquarters of this CD block is at Pingla.

Gram panchayats of Pingla block/ panchayat samiti are: Kusumda, Jamna, Dhaneswarpur, Karkai, Maligram, Khirai, Gobardhanpur, Pindrui, Jalchak-I, Jalchak-II.

Demographics

Population
According to the 2011 Census of India, Pingla CD block had a total population of 194,809, all of which were rural. There were 99,988 (51%) males and 94,821 (49%) females. Population in the age range 0–6 years was 22,719. Scheduled Castes numbered 16,428 (8.43%) and Scheduled Tribes numbered 19,322 (9.92%).

According to the 2001 census, Pingla block had a total population of 170,792, out of which 88,251 were males and 82,541 were females. Pingla block registered a population growth of 14.25 per cent during the 1991-2001 decade. Decadal growth for the combined Midnapore district was 14.87 per cent. Decadal growth in West Bengal was 17.45 per cent.

Large villages (with 4,000+ population) in Pingla CD block are (2011 census figures in brackets): Pingla (5,253), Khirai (6,427), Maligram (11,337), Pindrui (4,384), Dangalsa (5,190) and Jalchak (6,793).

Other villages in Pingla CD block are (2011 census figures in brackets): Gobardhanpur (3,665), Karkai (3,113), Dhaneshwarpur Uttar Bar (539), Dhaneshwarpur Madhyabar (1,247), Dhaneshwarpur Jamua (152), Dhaneswarour Paikan Uttar Bar (697), Dhaneshwarpur Paikan Dakhin Bar (270), Dhaneshwarpur Paschim Bar (1,852), Jamna (3,336), Karkai (3,113) and Raj Ballabh (819).

Literacy
According to the 2011 census the total number of literate persons in Pingla CD block was 143,882 (83.57% of the population over 6 years) out of which males numbered 79,657 (90.22% of the male population over 6 years) and females numbered 64,165 (76.57% of the female population over 6 years). The gender gap in literacy rates was 13.65%.

See also – List of West Bengal districts ranked by literacy rate

Language and religion
According to the District Census Handbook, Paschim Medinipur, 2011 census, as of 2001, Bengali was the mother-tongue of 90.5% of the population of Paschim Medinipur district, followed by Santali (4.6%), Hindi (1.4%), Kurmali Thar (0.7%), Urdu (0.6%), Telugu (0.6%), Odia (0.4%), Mundari (0.2%), Koda/ Kora (0.1%), Munda (0.1%) and Nepali (0.1%). There were people, forming lesser proportion of population, having other languages as mother-tongue. People with other mother-tongues formed 0.7% of the population.

According to the West Bengal Official Language Act 1961 and the West Bengal Official Language (Amendment Act) 2012, the Bengali language is to be used for official purposes in the whole of West Bengal. In addition to Bengali, the Nepali language is to be used for official purposes in the three hills subdivisions, namely Darjeeling, Kalimpong and Kurseong, in the district of Darjeeling, and Urdu is to be used for official purposes in district/subdivision/ block/ municipality where the population speaking Urdu exceeds 10% of the total population.  The English language will continue to be used for official purposes as it was being used prior to the enactment of these laws.

The West Bengal Official Language (Second Amendment) Bill, 2012, included Hindi, Santhali, Odiya and Punjabi as official languages if it is spoken by a population exceeding 10 per cent of the whole in a particular block or sub-division or a district.  Subsequently, Kamtapuri, Rajbanshi and Kurmali were also included in the list of minority languages by the West Bengal Official Language (Second Amendment) Bill, 2018. However, as of 2020, there is no official / other reliable information about the areas covered. Census 2011 provides language data only at the district and above level.

In the 2011 census Hindus formed 85.61% of the population in Pingla CD block. Muslims formed 14.29% of the population. Others formed 0.10% of the population. Others include Addi Bassi, Marang Boro, Santal, Saranath, Sari Dharma, Sarna, Alchchi, Bidin, Sant, Saevdharm, Seran, Saran, Sarin, Kheria, Christian and other religious communities.

BPL families
In Pingla CD block 50.51% families were living below poverty line in 2007.

According to the District Human Development Report of Paschim Medinipur: The 29 CD blocks of the district were classified into four categories based on the poverty ratio. Nayagram, Binpur II and Jamboni CD blocks have very high poverty levels (above 60%). Kharagpur I, Kharagpur II, Sankrail, Garhbeta II, Pingla and Mohanpur CD blocks have high levels of poverty (50-60%), Jhargram, Midnapore Sadar, Dantan I, Gopiballavpur II, Binpur I, Dantan II, Keshiari, Chandrakona I, Gopiballavpur I, Chandrakona II, Narayangarh, Keshpur, Ghatal, Sabang, Garhbeta I, Salboni, Debra and Garhbeta III CD blocks have moderate levels of poverty (25-50%) and Daspur II and Daspur I CD blocks have low levels of poverty (below 25%).

Economy

Infrastructure
175 or 96% of mouzas in Pingla CD block were electrified by 31 March 2014. 
 
175 mouzas in Pingla CD block had drinking water facilities in 2013-14. There were 113 fertiliser depots, 124 seed stores and 38 fair price shops in the CD Block.

Agriculture

Although the Bargadari Act of 1950 recognised the rights of bargadars to a higher share of crops from the land that they tilled, it was not implemented fully. Large tracts, beyond the prescribed limit of land ceiling, remained with the rich landlords. From 1977 onwards major land reforms took place in West Bengal. Land in excess of land ceiling was acquired and distributed amongst the peasants. Following land reforms land ownership pattern has undergone transformation. In 2013-14, persons engaged in agriculture in Pingla CD block could be classified as follows: bargadars 3.75%, patta (document) holders 26.70%, small farmers (possessing land between 1 and 2 hectares) 3.29%, marginal farmers (possessing land up to 1 hectare) 19.35% and agricultural labourers 46.90%.

In 2005-06 the nett cropped area in Pingla CD block was 18,600 hectares out of the total geographical area of 21,948 hectares and the area in which more than one crop was grown was 18,377 hectares.

The extension of irrigation has played a role in growth of the predominantly agricultural economy. In 2013-14, the total area irrigated in Pingla CD block was 13,170 hectares, out of which 2,000 hectares were irrigated by tank water, 10,400 hectares by deep tubewells and 770 hectares by other methods.

In 2013-14, Pingla CD block produced 36,526 tonnes of Aman paddy, the main winter crop, from 17,429 hectares, 2,738 tonnes of Aus paddy (summer crop) from 1,372 hectares, 44,560 tonnes of Boro paddy (spring crop) from 14,225 hectares, 53 tonnes of wheat from 24 hectares, 14,027 tonnes of Jute from 983 hectares and 38 tonnes of potatoes from 2 hectares. It also produced pulses and oilseeds.

Banking
In 2013-14, Pingla CD block had offices of 6 commercial banks and 2 gramin banks.

Transport
Pingla CD block has 24 originating/ terminating bus routes. The nearest railway station is 11 km from the CD block headquarters.

Education
In 2013-14, Pingla CD block had 145 primary schools with 11,830 students, 6 middle schools with 400 students, 11 high schools with 6,371 students and 18 higher secondary schools with 18,935 students. Pingla CD block had 1 general college with 1,005 students, 1 technical / professional institutions with 100 students and 321 institutions for special and non-formal education with 12,373 students.

The United Nations Development Programme considers the combined primary and secondary enrolment ratio as the simple indicator of educational achievement of the children in the school going age. The infrastructure available is important. In Pingla CD block out of the total 145 primary schools in 2008-2009, 22 had pucca buildings, 64 partially pucca, 16 kucha and 43 multiple type.

Pingla Thana Mahavidyalaya is a co-educational college established in 1965 at Maligram. Affiliated to Vidyasagar University, it offers honours courses in Bengali, English, Sanskrit, history, philosophy, political science, geography, education, physics, chemistry, mathematics and botany.

Culture
The Pingla CD block has several heritage temples.

Healthcare
In 2014, Pingla CD block had 1 rural hospital, 3 primary health centres and 1 private nursing home with total 57 beds and 10 doctors. It had 29 family welfare sub centres and 1 family welfare centre. 3,554 patients were treated indoor and 100,276 patients were treated outdoor in the hospitals, health centres and subcentres of the CD block.

Pingla Rural Hospital, with 30 beds at Pingla, is the major Government medical facility in the Pingla CD block. There are primary health centres at: Jalchak (with 10 beds), Harma (PO Gobardhanpur) (with 6 beds) and Boalia (PO Dhaneswarpur) (with 6 beds)

References

Community development blocks in Paschim Medinipur district